Jorge Luis Garcia (September 10, 1953 – October 15, 2010) was a Democratic politician. He served as Arizona State Senator for District 27 beginning in 2003, where he held the title of Assistant Minority Leader. Previously he was a member of the Arizona House of Representatives from 1993 through 1996. He died of heart failure on October 15, 2010.

References

External links

 Senator Jorge Luis Garcia – District 27 official State Senate website
 Profile at Project Vote Smart
 Follow the Money – Jorge Luis Garcia
 2008 2006 2004 2002 1996 campaign contributions

1953 births
2010 deaths
American politicians of Mexican descent
Democratic Party Arizona state senators
Hispanic and Latino American state legislators in Arizona
Democratic Party members of the Arizona House of Representatives
People from Nogales, Sonora
Mexican emigrants to the United States